Steinway may refer to:
 Steinway & Sons, an American-German piano company

People
 C.F. Theodore Steinway, son of Henry E. Steinway
 Henry E. Steinway, piano technician and founder of Steinway & Sons
 Henry Z. Steinway, piano technician and great-grandson of Henry E. Steinway
 Theodore E. Steinway, piano technician, philatelist and son of William Steinway
 William Steinway, piano technician, civil leader and son of Henry E. Steinway

Places
 Steinway Hall, a building housing concert halls, showrooms and sales departments for Steinway & Sons pianos
 Steinway Mansion, a historic home in Astoria, Queens, New York City, the United States
 Steinway Street, a major street in Astoria, Queens, New York City, the United States
 Steinway Street (IND Queens Boulevard Line), a subway station in Astoria, Queens, New York City, the United States
 Steinway Tunnel, a subway tunnel in Manhattan and Queens, New York City, the United States
 The Steinway Tower, a residential skyscraper in Manhattan, New York City, the United States

Other
 Steinway Car, a subway car
 Steinway Lyngdorf, audio systems
 Steinway Musical Instruments, a musical instrument manufacturing conglomerate and parent company of Steinway & Sons
 Steinway Omnibus, a bus company
 Steinway Transit Corporation, a bus company